James Clifford Howell (born 17 May 1967) is an English chess grandmaster and author. He earned his international master title in 1985 and his grandmaster title ten years later, in 1995. He reached his peak rating in July 1995, at 2525. He became inactive in 1996.

Books

Notes

External links
 
 James C. Howell player profile and games at 365chess.com

Chess grandmasters
Chess players from London
British chess writers
1967 births
Living people